Natural Essence is an album by pianist Cyrus Chestnut that was recorded in 2015 and released on the HighNote label the following year.

Reception

According to the AllMusic review by Matt Collar: "While many of Chestnut's recordings lean toward the strait-laced and straight-ahead approach to modern jazz, he is by no means a reserved musical traditionalist. On the contrary, while he is adept at swinging acoustic jazz, one of his most formative experiences was as a member of vocalist Betty Carter's trio. A genre-bending maverick, Carter purportedly encouraged Chestnut to try new things and approach even the most well-known standard in an unexpected way. That expectation defying aesthetic fits nicely into Chestnut's work here with Williams and White, who come from a generation of jazz musicians who grew up playing electrified fusion, funk, and highly progressive post-bop influenced by the avant-garde. While the music here is more stripped down to the jazz essentials, they nonetheless tackle even the most well-known standard, like 'It Could Happen to You,' with a creative ebullience and in-the-moment spontaneity that grab your attention throughout. Also thrilling are the trio's takes on several original compositions".

In JazzTimes, Mike Joyce stated: "Chordal jabs, light-fingered trills, cascading runs, robust turnarounds-no question: Pianist Cyrus Chestnut is in delightfully animated form".

Track listing 
 "Mamacita" (Joe Henderson) – 5:33
 "It Could Happen to You" (Jimmy Van Heusen, Johnny Burke) – 7:12	
 "Faith Amongst the Unknown" (Cyrus Chestnut) – 6:15
 "I Cover the Waterfront" (Johnny Green, Edward Heyman) – 6:57
 "I Remember" (Chestnut) – 7:34
 "Dedication" (Lenny White) – 8:01
 "My Romance" (Richard Rodgers, Lorenz Hart) – 9:06
 "Toku-Do" (Buster Williams) – 6:20
 "Minority" (Gigi Gryce) – 6:11

Personnel 
Cyrus Chestnut – piano
Buster Williams - bass 
Lenny White – drums

References 

2016 albums
Cyrus Chestnut albums
HighNote Records albums